Montorfano (English: "orphan hill";) is a town and comune in the province of Como, part of Lombardy, in northern Italy. It has about 2,500 inhabitants. The main attractions of Montorfano are its own very small lake and the Circolo Golf Villa d'Este, one of the main Italian golf courses.

Cities and towns in Lombardy